CP 55,940 is a synthetic cannabinoid which mimics the effects of naturally occurring THC (one of the psychoactive compounds found in cannabis). CP 55,940 was created by Pfizer in 1974 but was never marketed. It is currently used to study the endocannabinoid system.

A study found that CP 55,940 can upregulate 5-HT2A receptors in mice.

CP 55,940 is 45 times more potent than Δ9-THC, and fully antagonized by rimonabant (SR141716A).

CP 55,940 is considered a full agonist at both CB1 and CB2 receptors and has Ki values of 0.58 nM and 0.68 nM respectively, but is an antagonist at GPR55, the putative "CB3" receptor.

CP 55,940 showed protective effects on rat brain mitochondria upon paraquat exposure.

It also showed neuroprotective effects by reducing intracellular calcium release and reducing hippocampal cell death in cultured neurons subjected to high levels of NMDA.

CP 55,940 induced cell death in NG 108-15 Mouse neuroblastoma x Rat glioma hybrid brain cancer (genetically engineered mouse x rat brain cancer) cells.

See also 
 CP 47,497
 CP 55,244

References 

Primary alcohols
Cyclohexanols
Cannabinoids
Designer drugs
Pfizer brands
Phenols
CB1 receptor agonists
CB2 receptor agonists